Néstor Enrique Colmenares Uzcategui (born September 5, 1987) is a Venezuelan professional basketball player, who lastly played for U-BT Cluj-Napoca of the Liga Națională. He is also a member of the senior Venezuela National Team. A power forward, his nickname is "La Bestia" ("The Beast"), He is known as a proficient rebounder.

College career
Colmenares played college basketball at Indian Hills C.C. (JUCO), and at Campbellsville (NAIA).

Professional career
In his pro career, Colmenares has played in both the 2nd-tier South American League, and the 1st-tier FIBA Americas League. He won the 2016 FIBA Americas League championship with Guaros de Lara.

On November 5, 2019, Colmenares signed with Maccabi Haifa of the Israeli Premier League. He averaged 10.7 points and 9.2 rebounds per game. On August 30, 2020, Colmenares signed with U-BT Cluj-Napoca of the Liga Națională.

National team career
With the senior men's Venezuela national basketball team, Colmenares has played at the following tournaments: the 2011 FIBA Americas Championship, the 2013 FIBA Americas Championship, the 2014 South American Championship, where he won a gold medal, the 2015 Pan American Games, the 2015 FIBA Americas Championship, where he won a gold medal, the 2016 South American Championship, where he won a gold medal, and the 2016 Summer Olympics.

References

External links
Twitter
Instagram
FIBA Profile
FIBA Game Center Profile
Latinbasket.com Profile
Realgm.com Profile
Basquetplus.com Profile 
Guaros de Lara Profile 

1987 births
Living people
2019 FIBA Basketball World Cup players
Abejas de León players
Basketball players at the 2016 Summer Olympics
Basketball players at the 2019 Pan American Games
Campbellsville Tigers men's basketball players
Cocodrilos de Caracas players
Guaros de Lara (basketball) players
Huracanes de Tampico players
Indian Hills Warriors basketball players
Maccabi Haifa B.C. players
Olympic basketball players of Venezuela
Power forwards (basketball)
Sportspeople from Caracas
Unión de Sunchales basketball players
Venezuelan expatriate basketball people in Argentina
Venezuelan expatriate basketball people in Israel
Venezuelan expatriate basketball people in Mexico
Venezuelan expatriate basketball people in the United States
Venezuelan expatriate basketball people in Uruguay
Venezuelan men's basketball players
Pan American Games competitors for Venezuela
Basketball players at the 2015 Pan American Games